Untuk Angeline is an Indonesian tragedy drama film released on July 21, 2016 and directed by Jito Banyu. The film is based on real story Engeline murder.

Cast 
 Kinaryosih as Samidah
 Naomi Ivo as Angeline
 Teuku Rifnu Wikana as Santo
 Roweina Umboh as Terry
 Paramitha Rusady as Mrs. Dewi
 Hans de Kraker as John
 Audrey Junicka as young Angeline
 Dewangga Yudantara as Kevin
 Rey Bong as young Kevin
 Vonny Anggraeni as Ni Luh
 Ratna Riantiarno as Chief Judge
 Dewi Hughes as Mrs. Kadek
 Asep Jaya as Anton
 Vennya Adisuryo as Intan
 Frilly Doeni as Kiara
 Marsya Doeni as Tari
 Niken Septikasari as Mama Kiara
 Nanda as Dinda
 Nina Octavia as nurse
 Prastopo as Jury
 Iran as Jury
 Agung Nugoroho as lawyer
 Marianto Samosir as lawyer
 Yan Widjaya as attorney
 Anoki as police
 Iqbal Perdana as attorney
 Hari as police
 Yulius Pasha as police
 Bella sebagai Nia
 Bintang as Chacha
 Emma Waroka

References 

 

2016 films
Indonesian drama films
Films based on actual events